María Cecilia Botero Cadavid (born 13 May 1955) is a Colombian actress, television presenter and journalist.

Biography

Beginnings
She studied anthropology long before becoming an actress. She is the daughter of former actor, librettist and director Jaime Botero Gómez. She is the niece of Dora Cadavid.

Botero began her acting career with production El Fantasma de Canterville (1971), alongside Carlos Benjumea, Maruja Toro, Enrique Pontón and Franky Linero. She replaced Mariela Hijuelos, who died during the recording of La Vorágine (1975). She was Manuela Saénz in the series Bolívar, el hombre de las dificultades(1981). She was María Cándida in La Pezuña del Diablo (1983), Yadira La Ardiente in Caballo Viejo (1988) and Sándalo Daza in Música Maestro (1990). Her brothers Óscar Botero and Ana Cristina Botero are also actors.

Professional success
She debuted as movies actress in 1972, when she starred in the film María, alongside Fernando Allende. María Cecilia Botero is known for her professionalism, thus becoming one of the most beloved figures in Colombian entertainment.

Her first television role was obtained in 1971, acting in El fantasma de Canterville. Then she participated in Lunes de Comedia, La Vorágine, Caminos de Gloria, Lejos del Nido, Los novios, La Pezuña del Diablo, La Rosa de los Vientos, Dos Mujeres and A.M.A. la Academia, just to mention a few productions.

Perhaps her most remembered characters are Yadira la Ardiente, from the telenovela Caballo Viejo, and Sándalo Daza, from Música Maestro.

Parallel to her career as antress, María Cecilia produced and starred in several musical comedies directed by her husband, the Argentine David Stivel (whom she married in 1982), now deceased. With him, she had a son named Mateo Stivelberg. Her dream of popularizing musical theater in Colombia led her to make productions as important as Peter Pan, Sugar and La Mujer del Año.

The versatile artist also stood out as the presenter of television newscasts (CM& and Noticero de las 7) and as host of the talk shows María C. Contigo and Las Tardes de María C.

In 2005 she was invited to be part of the soap opera Lorena, produced by RCN Television, where she played her first antagonistic role, giving life to the evil Rufina de Ferrero, where she radically changed her look and showed her great histrionic capacity.

María Cecilia has not neglected her vocation as a teacher and she directs the Charlot Academy, the acting school created by her father, Jaime Botero. With many decades of experience forming artists, Charlot is one of the best acting academies in Latin America.  

She presented the program Día a Día on the Caracol Television channel, together with Catalina Gómez and Agmeth Escaf.

Movie Encanto
In 2021, she participated doing the voice of Abuela Alma in the Disney movie Encanto, along with other acting voices, such as John Leguizamo, Angie Cepeda, and Carolina Gaitán.

Filmography

Television

Film

TV presenter

Musical theater 

 La Mujer del año
 Sugar 
 La Invencible Molly Brown 
 Peter Pan 
 Música Maestro (1990)
 Los caballeros las prefieren rubias

Nominations and awards

TVyNovelas awards 

|-
| 2015
| La suegra
| Best antagonistic actress in a telenovela 
| 
|-
|2000
| Noticiero de las 7
| Best newscaster/anchor 
| 
|-
|1997
| Dos Mujeres
| Best leading actress in a telenovela 
| 
|-
|1995 - 1994 
| Noticiero CM&
| Best newscaster/anchor  
|

Other awards

{| class="wikitable"
!Year
!Award
!Category / Work
!Result
|-
|2020
|India Catalina Award
|Career as an actress 
| 
|-
|1997
|Simón Bolívar Award
|Best Actress 
| 
|-
|1997
|Simón Bolívar Order
|Career as an actress 
| 
|-
|1997
|Gloria de la TV (TV Glory)
|50 Years of Colombian TV 
| 
|-
|1997
|Caracol Memorial Tablet (Placa Caracol)
|One of the best Colombian actresses, 
in the framework of the 50 years of Colombian TV 
|

See also
 Botero (surname). Italian surname
 Television in Colombia

References 

1955 births
Living people
Colombian telenovela actresses
Colombian women
People from Medellín